Oa or Oae or Oai ( or Ὀά) was a deme of ancient Attica, originally of the phyle of Pandionis, but after 127/8 AD, of the phyle of Hadrianis, sending four delegates to the Athenian Boule. 

Its site is located near modern Papangelaki.

References

Populated places in ancient Attica
Former populated places in Greece
Demoi